Mountain is the surname of the following people
Edgar Mountain (1901–1985), British runner
Frank Mountain (1860–1939), American baseball player
Lance Mountain (born 1964), American skateboarder
Pat Mountain (born 1976), former Welsh footballer
Patricia Mountain, English politician
Peter Mountain (1923–2013), English violinist
Reginald Mountain (1899–1981), British civil engineer
Ronald Gervase Mountain (1897–1983), British Indian Army officer